The Devil's General is a 1955 black and white West German film based on the play of the same title by Carl Zuckmayer.  The film features Curd Jürgens as General Harras, Marianne Koch, Viktor de Kowa, Karl John, Eva Ingeborg Scholz, and Harry Meyen. It was shot at the Wandsbek Studios in Hamburg. The film's sets were designed by the art directors Albrecht Becker and Herbert Kirchhoff.

Plot
Nazi Germany in 1941. The title character is Luftwaffe General Harras, a highly decorated World War I veteran contemptuous of the Third Reich and the World War II attempt to conquer Europe. Initially courted by SS officials, he continually mocks the Nazi leadership, which leads to friends turning into enemies and suspicion from SS and Gestapo of what may be treason.

He is temporarily arrested by order of Heinrich Himmler and, after his release, is determined to break his deal with the devil. He backs the sabotage action of his flight engineer, threatens an SS officer at gunpoint and finally crashes his aircraft into the control tower of his airbase.

Cast 
Curd Jürgens as Harras, whose character is supposedly based upon German Luftwaffe General Ernst Udet
Bum Krüger as Lüttjohann, Harras's adjutant.
Paul Westermeier as Korrianke, Harras's chauffeur.
Albert Lieven as Friedrich Eilers, Colonel & squadron leader.
Harry Meyen as Hartmann, Luftwaffe officer.
Hans Daniel as Hastenteuffel, Luftwaffe officer.
Beppo Brem as Pfundtmayer, Luftwaffe officer.
Karl Ludwig Diehl as Sigbert von Mohrungen, President of the Raw Materials Procurement Department.
Werner Fuetterer as Baron Pflungk, Attaché in the Ministry of Foreign Affairs.
Viktor de Kowa as Dr. Schmidt-Lausitz, Nazi Party official.
Karl John as Oderbruch, engineer in the Ministry of Aviation.
Erica Balqué as Anne Eilers, Friedrich Eilers' wife.
Eva Ingeborg Scholz as Waltraut von Mohrungen, nicknamed Pützchen, Anne's sister.
Camilla Spira as Olivia Geiss, diva.
Marianne Koch as Diddo Geiss, Olivia's niece; love interest of General Harras, despite how much younger than him she is.
Ingrid van Bergen as Lyra Schoeppke, named "die Tankstelle," which means "The Gas Station."
Inge Meysel as Frau Korrianke.
Joseph Offenbach as Zernick, SS-Hauptsturmführer.
Wolfgang Neuss as police photographer.
Robert Meyn as von Stetten, Generalleutnant.
Werner Riepel as Kleinschmidt,, Göring's chauffeur.
Werner Schumacher as SS-Wachtmeister.
Wolfried Lier as Herr Detlev, restaurant waiter.

Production 

The literary model by Zuckmayer was supposed to be based on the fate (and in the film nothing more) of his friend, Luftwaffe general Ernst Udet, who committed suicide in 1941. It was shot in Hamburg and Berlin using Swedish-built Junkers Ju 86 bombers with license-built Bristol Mercury engines on a local airfield including its offices with Esselte Files on the shelf. The parking lot contains a post-war VW Bus. All Uniforms were of a material and tailoring standard unknown in wartime Germany. Contrary to living quarters that were very close to that of well-to-do circles in Berlin at the time.

At the German Film Awards of 1955 Marianne Koch won the Film Award in Silver for Outstanding Individual Achievement: Supporting Actress for her performance in the film.

References

External links 
 

1955 films
1955 war films
German war films
West German films
1950s German-language films
Films directed by Helmut Käutner
Films set in Berlin
German films based on plays
Films based on works by Carl Zuckmayer
Films about the German Resistance
World War II aviation films
Real Film films
German World War II films
German black-and-white films
1950s German films
Films shot at Wandsbek Studios
Films shot in Hamburg